Marc Jenkins (born 21 July 1976) is a Welsh triathlete from Bridgend.

Jenkins competed at the second Olympic triathlon at the 2004 Summer Olympics.  He was the last man to finish, because of a collision during the cycling leg that left his bicycle unusable. Rather than quit, he ran the two remaining kilometers with the bike on his shoulders to place forty-fifth of the fifty who started.  His time was 2:05:33.60.

Jenkins married fellow Olympic triathlete, Helen Tucker, in October 2008.

External links
 BBC News: "Jenkins triumphs in adversity"
Photo of Marc Jenkins

References

1976 births
Living people
Welsh male triathletes
Triathletes at the 2004 Summer Olympics
Olympic triathletes of Great Britain
Commonwealth Games competitors for Wales
Triathletes at the 2006 Commonwealth Games
Triathletes at the 2002 Commonwealth Games
Sportspeople from Bridgend